A connective tissue disease (collagenosis) is any disease that has the connective tissues of the body as a target of pathology.  Connective tissue is any type of biological tissue with an extensive extracellular matrix that supports, binds together, and protects organs. These tissues form a framework, or matrix, for the body, and are composed of two major structural protein molecules: collagen and elastin. There are many different types of collagen protein in each of the body's tissues. Elastin has the capability of stretching and returning to its original length—like a spring or rubber band. Elastin is the major component of ligaments (tissues that attach bone to bone) and skin.  In patients with connective tissue disease, it is common for collagen and elastin to become injured by inflammation (ICT). Many connective tissue diseases feature abnormal immune system activity with inflammation in tissues as a result of an immune system that is directed against one's own body tissues (autoimmunity).

Diseases in which inflammation or weakness of collagen tends to occur are also referred to as collagen diseases. Collagen vascular diseases can be (but are not necessarily) associated with collagen and blood vessel abnormalities that are autoimmune in nature. See also vasculitis.

Connective tissue diseases can have strong or weak inheritance risks, and can also be caused by environmental factors.

Heritable connective tissue disorders
 Marfan syndrome – a genetic disease causing abnormal fibrillin.
 Ehlers–Danlos syndromes – a heterogeneous group of disorders characterized by connective tissue fragility. Most, but not all, are due to a defect in the synthesis of collagen (Type I or III) and cause progressive deterioration of collagen, with different EDS types affecting different sites in the body, such as joints, heart valves, organ walls, arterial walls (due to where the affected connective tissue component is found throughout the body).
 Hypermobility spectrum disorder—a disorder formerly subsumed under the hypermobile EDS subtype. Due to modifications to the 2017 hEDS diagnostic criteria, joint hypermobility (and associated joint complications) without other signs of a hereditary connective tissue disorder now classifies for a diagnosis of one of the hypermobility spectrum disorders.
 Osteogenesis imperfecta (brittle bone disease) – caused by poor quality collagen, or insufficient amounts of normal collagen (primarily type I), necessary for healthy, strong bones and certain other connective tissues.
 Stickler syndrome – affects collagen (primarily type II and XI), and may result in a distinctive facial appearance, eye abnormalities, hearing loss, and joint problems.
 Alport syndrome – defects in collagen (type IV), found in the renal basement membrane, inner ear and eyes, leading to glomerulonephritis, hearing loss, and eye disease, respectively.
 Congenital contractural arachnodactyly – Also known as Beals syndrome. It is akin to Marfan syndrome but with contractures of hip, knee, elbows and ankle joint and crumpled ear.
 Loeys–Dietz syndrome – The disorder is marked by aneurysms in the aorta, often in children. Symptoms appear to be like Marfan Syndrome and EDS. This is caused by a mutation in the gene TGFBR on either chromosome 3 or 9 depending on the type.

Autoimmune connective tissue disorders

These are also referred to as systemic autoimmune diseases. The autoimmune CTDs may have both genetic and environmental causes.  Genetic factors may create a predisposition towards developing these autoimmune diseases.  They are characterized as a group by the presence of spontaneous overactivity of the immune system that results in the production of extra antibodies into the circulation.  The classic collagen vascular diseases have a "classic" presentation with typical findings that doctors can recognize during an examination. Each also has "classic" blood test abnormalities and abnormal antibody patterns. However, each of these diseases can evolve slowly or rapidly from very subtle abnormalities before demonstrating the classic features that help in the diagnosis.  The classic collagen vascular diseases include:
 Systemic lupus erythematosus (SLE) – An inflammation of the connective tissues, SLE can afflict every organ system. It is up to nine times more common in women than men and affects black women three times as often as white women. The condition is aggravated by sunlight.
 Rheumatoid arthritis – Rheumatoid arthritis is a systemic disorder in which immune cells attack and inflame the membrane around joints. It also can affect the heart, lungs, and eyes. Of the estimated 2.1 million Americans with rheumatoid arthritis, approximately 1.5 million (71 percent) are women.
 Scleroderma – an activation of immune cells that produces scar tissue in the skin, internal organs, and small blood vessels. It affects women three times more often than men overall, but increases to a rate 15 times greater for women during childbearing years, and appears to be more common among black women.
 Sjögren's syndrome – also called Sjögren's disease, is a chronic, slowly progressing inability to secrete saliva and tears. It can occur alone or with rheumatoid arthritis, scleroderma, or systemic lupus erythematosus. Nine out of 10 cases occur in women, most often at or around mid-life.
 Mixed connective tissue disease – Mixed connective-tissue disease (MCTD) is a disorder in which features of various connective-tissue diseases (CTDs) such as systemic lupus erythematosus (SLE); systemic sclerosis (SSc); dermatomyositis (DM); polymyositis (PM); anti-synthetase syndrome; and, occasionally, Sjögren syndrome can coexist and overlap. The course of the disease is chronic and usually milder than other CTDs. In most cases, MCTD is considered an intermediate stage of a disease that eventually becomes either SLE or Scleroderma.
 Undifferentiated connective tissue disease (UCTD) is a disease in which the body mistakenly attacks its own tissues. It is diagnosed when there is evidence of an existing autoimmune condition which does not meet the criteria for any specific autoimmune disease, such as systemic lupus erythematosus or scleroderma. Latent lupus and incomplete lupus are alternative terms that have been used to describe this condition.
 Psoriatic arthritis is also a collagen vascular disease.

Other connective tissue disorders
 Peyronie's disease – involving the growth of abnormal collagen (Type I and III) in the penis.
 Scurvy – caused by a dietary deficiency in vitamin C, leading to abnormal collagen.
 Fibromuscular dysplasia a disease of the blood vessels leading to abnormal growth in the arterial wall.

References

External links

 Merck Manual: Musculoskeletal and connective tissue disorders
 Merck Manual: Inherited connective tissue disorders
 Arthritis Foundation
 The Myositis Foundation